Jay is a surname. Notable people with the surname include:

 Allan Jay (born 1931), British world champion épée & foil fencer
 Antoine Jay (1770–1854), French writer
 Antony Jay (1930–2016), British writer
 Bill Jay (1940–2009) photographer, magazine and picture editor, etc
 Candee Jay (born 1981), Dutch musician
 Charlotte Jay (1919–1996), Australian writer
 David Jay (born 1982), American activist
 Douglas Jay, Baron Jay (1907–1996), British politician
 Herman Jay (born 1976), International Aesthetic dentist
 Isabel Jay (1879–1927), British opera singer
 Joey Jay (born 1935), American baseball player
 John Jay (1745–1829), American politician and jurist
 John Jay (1817–1894), American lawyer
 Jon Jay (born 1985), American baseball player
 Karla Jay (born 1947), American writer
 Margaret Jay, Baroness Jay of Paddington (born 1939), British politician
 Marie-Louise Jaÿ (1838–1925), French businesswoman
 Martin Jay (born 1944), American historian
 Michael Jay, Baron Jay of Ewelme (born 1946), British politician
 Norman Jay (born 1957), British DJ
 Paul Jay (born 1951), Canadian film director and journalist
 Paul L. Jay (born 1946), American literary theorist
 Peter Augustus Jay (1776–1843), American public servant
 Peter Jay (born 1937), British broadcaster and diplomat
 Pierre Jay (1870–1949), American banker
 Ricky Jay (1948–2018), American magician
 Steve Jay (born 1951), American bassist
 Tony Jay (1933–2006), British actor
 Tyler Jay (born 1994), baseball player
 Vincent Jay (born 1985), French biathlete
 William Jay (minister) (1769–1853), British preacher
 William Jay (jurist) (1789–1858), American jurist
 William Jay (Colonel) (died 1915), American army colonel

Jay is also a transliteration of the Korean surname Chae.

See also
Jay (disambiguation)
Jaye, which refers to people who have either the given name or surname Jaye